James Hamilton, 6th Earl of Abercorn, PC (Ire) ( – 1734), was a Scottish and Irish peer and politician. Appointed a groom of the bedchamber to Charles II after the his father's death in battle, he took the Williamite side at the Glorious Revolution and in March 1689 supplied Derry with stores that enabled the town to sustain the Siege of Derry until it was relieved in August. Shortly after inheriting a Scottish and Irish peerage from a second cousin, he was created a viscount in Ireland for his services to the Williamite cause.

Birth and origins 
James was born in 1661 or 1662, the eldest son of James Hamilton and his wife Elizabeth Colepeper. His father, James the elder, was a colonel in the English army, Hyde Park Ranger, and a groom of the bedchamber to Charles II of England. His father's family was a cadet branch of the Abercorns that started with his grandfather Sir George Hamilton, 1st Baronet, of Donalong, who was the fourth son of the 1st Earl of Abercorn.

James's mother was a daughter of John Colepeper, 1st Baron Colepeper, an English courtier. His parents married in 1661. James, the younger, was one of six sons, of which three survived into adulthood. and are listed in his father's article. James, the younger, was raised a Protestant as his father, who had originally been a Catholic, had converted to that faith to marry his mother.

Father's and grandfather's successions 
On 6 June 1673 when he was about twelve years old, his father died from a wound received at a sea fight with the Dutch in the Third Anglo-Dutch War. James, the younger, was compensated by an appointment as an extra groom of the bedchamber on 18 April 1680. His father had predeceased his grandfather who still held the land of Donalong between Strabane and Derry in Ireland.

When his grandfather died in 1679, James, the younger, inherited the land and should have succeeded to his grandfather's baronetcy, i.e. Baronet Hamilton of Donalong, but he never assumed the title calling himself Captain Hamilton, his rank in the English army. This might indicate that this baronetcy had never been properly created.

Marriage and children 
Captain Hamilton married the heiress Elizabeth Reading, daughter of Sir Robert Reading, 1st Baronet, of Dublin, and Jane Hannay, widow of Charles Coote, 1st Earl of Mountrath, in January 1684. Charles II issued a warrant on 22 January 1684 to create Hamilton "Baron Hamilton of Bellamont", county Dublin, in the Irish peerage, but it never passed the seals.

 
James and Elizabeth had 14 children nine sons:
Robert (1687), died as a young child
James (1686–1744), became the 7th Earl
Robert, died very young
John (c. 1694 – 1714), never married 
George, died in infancy
George (died 1775), MP, married and had issue
Rev. Hon. Francis Hamilton (1700–1746), married and had issue
William (1703–1721), was lost aboard HMS Royal Anne Galley 
Charles (1704–1786), MP, married and had issue

—and five daughters:
Elizabeth Hamilton, married firstly on 2 January 1711 William Brownlow, and secondly in 1741 Martin, Count de Kearnie Through her first marriage she is an ancestress of actor Ralph Fiennes.
Jane, died in infancy
Mary (born before 1704), married in January 1719 Henry Colley of Carbury Castle, County Kildare and had issue
Philippa Hamilton (died 1767), married Rev. Benjamin Pratt without issue, then married Michael O'Connell of London and had one son
Jane (before 1704 – 1753), married Archibald Douglas-Hamilton as his third wife She also was mistress to Frederick, Prince of Wales.

Expedition to Derry 
Captain Hamilton's post in the bedchamber ended with the King's death in 1685. He had entered a career in the army and held a commission in the English army of the new king, James II.

In 1688 at the Glorious Revolution he sided with William. In spring 1689 when war menaced in northern Ireland, he was sent to Derry with provisions in order to prepare the city for a likely siege. On 21 March 1689 he arrived at Derry from England with two ships: the frigate  and the merchantman Deliverance, bringing gunpowder, munition, weapons, and £595 in cash. These provisions were to be crucial during the Siege of Derry. He also brought the commission from King William and Queen Mary that confirmed Colonel Robert Lundy as Williamite governor of the town.

He therefore helped to defend Derry. His uncle Richard Hamilton (officer), lieutenant-general in the Irish Royal Army, attacked it.

Member of parliament 
After the end of the Williamite war in Ireland, he was elected as one of the two MPs for Tyrone County in the Irish House of Commons on 22 September 1692 and again on 12 August 1695.

Sixth Earl of Abercorn 
In June 1701 died in Strabane his second cousin Charles Hamilton, 5th Earl of Abercorn, without surviving children. Captain Hamilton was his second cousin. The great-grandfather they had in common was James Hamilton, 1st Earl of Abercorn (see Family tree). Captain Hamilton succeeded as 6th Earl of Abercorn in the Scottish and 7th Baron Hamilton of Strabane in the Irish peerage. His eldest, James, acquired the courtesy title Lord Paisley as the heir apparent. The new Lord Abercorn also entered into the possession of the corresponding lands.

About six months later, on 2 December 1701, Lord Abercorn was rewarded by King William with the titles of Viscount Strabane and Baron Mountcastle, both in the Peerage of Ireland. The former was an enhancement of his title of Baron Hamilton of Strabane and was probably given to improve his precedence at the Irish House of Lords.

Lord Abercorn took his seat in the Irish House of Lords (as Viscount Strabane) on 21 September 1703, and in the Parliament of Scotland (as Earl of Abercorn) on 3 October 1706. By April 1711, he had been appointed also to the Privy Council of Ireland.

His father-in-law had built several lighthouses on Ireland's coast under a patent from Charles I. They had been made over to Hamilton as part of the dowry. In 1703 the Irish government found the lighthouses neglected and took them over. Hamilton was compensated by a payment of £3,000.

Death, succession, and timeline 
Abercorn died on 28 November 1734 at the age of 73 and was buried on 3 December in the Ormond vault of the Henry VII Chapel in Westminster Abbey. The Ormond Vault was opened in 1868 and was found to be filled with many coffins stacked one over the other. Their number was estimated at 59. Individual identification beyond the top layer was not attempted. Abercorn's remains may well be there.

He was succeeded by his eldest son James as the 7th Earl. His wife died on 19 March 1754.

Legacy 
Abercorn Street in Savannah, Georgia, is named for the 6th Earl.

Notes and references

Notes

Citations

Sources 

 
 
  – Marriages, baptisms and burials from about 1660 to 1875
  – (Preview)
  – 1649 to 1664
  – Ab-Adam to Basing
 
 
  
 
  – Viscounts
  – 1558 to 1699
  – Abercorn to Balmerino
  – (Snippet view)
  – with the report of the examination of the Ormond Vault in 1868

External links 

Robert O. Bucholz Database of Court Officers 1660 – 1837 Loyola University of Chicago

1660s births
1734 deaths
17th-century Irish politicians
18th-century Irish politicians
Burials at Westminster Abbey
06
James
Hamilton, James
Hamilton, James
Hamilton, James
Members of the Privy Council of Ireland
Peers of Ireland created by William III
Hamilton, James
Year of birth uncertain